Eger-Eszterházy SzSE (Hungarian: Eger-Eszterházy Szabadidő és Sportegyesület) currently known as QHB-Eger for sponsorship reasons, is a Hungarian handball club from Eger, that plays in the  Nemzeti Bajnokság I, the top level championship in Hungary.

Crest, colours, supporters

Naming history

Club crest

Kit manufacturers and Shirt sponsor
The following table shows in detail SBS-Eger kit manufacturers and shirt sponsors by year:

Kits

Sports Hall information
Name: – Kemény Ferenc Sportcsarnok
City: – Eger
Capacity: – 885
Address: – 3300 Eger, Stadion utca 8.

Management

Team

Current squad 

Squad for the 2022–23 season

Technical staff
 Head coach:  Edmond Tóth
 Goalkeeping coach:  Gábor György
 Fitness coach:  Csaba Halmay
 Masseur:  Márk Szepesi
 Club doctor:  Dr. Miklós Fónagy

Transfers
Transfers for the 2022–23 season

Joining 
  Károly Attila Tóth (CB) from  Orosházi FKSE
  Szabolcs Döme (LP) from  Orosházi FKSE
  András Gönczi (LP) from  Orosházi FKSE
  Máté Kurucz (RB) from  Fejér B.Á.L. Veszprém
  Barnabás Marczika (GK) from  Pick Szeged
  Áron Ágoston (GK) from  Balatonfüredi KSE
  András Schekk (LB) from  PLER KC
  Kevin Rozner (RW) from  PLER KC
  János Kepess (LW) from  NEKA
  Dominik Vrhovina (LP) on loan from  Budakalász FKC
  Roland Fórizs (LB) on loan from  Budakalász FKC

Leaving 
  Rolandas Bernatonis (LB) to  BM Benidorm
  Šimon Macháč (LP) to  Fejér B.Á.L. Veszprém
  Tibor Balogh (GK) to  Fejér B.Á.L. Veszprém
  Gábor Pulay (RB) to  Fejér B.Á.L. Veszprém
  Balázs Molnár (LW) to  Fejér B.Á.L. Veszprém
  Sajjad Esteki (LB) to  CSM Bacău
  Franco Gavidia (LP) to  TSV Blaustein
  Rajmond Tóth  (CB) to  Budakalász FKC
  Máté Lakosy (RW) to  HE-DO B. Braun Gyöngyös
  Lev Szuharev (RB) to  Sport36-Komló
  Noel Szepesi (LP) to  Ózdi KC
  Bence Bettembuk (LP) to  Ózdi KC
  Bence Seprős (GK)
  Márk Kovács (LP) to  CSM Oradea

Previous Squads

Top Scorers

Honours

Recent seasons

Seasons in Nemzeti Bajnokság I: 4
Seasons in Nemzeti Bajnokság I/B: 4
Seasons in Nemzeti Bajnokság II: 5

EHF ranking

Former club members

Notable former players

 Ádám Bajorhegyi
 Máté Halász
 Márk Hegedűs
 Ádám Iváncsik
 Dániel Füzi
 Balázs Molnár
 István Rédei
Péter Szabó
 István Szepesi
 Attila Tóth
 Fernando Skrebsky Dutra
 Alexander Radčenko
 Rolandas Bernatonis
 Jane Cvetkovski
 Vasko Dimitrovski
 Igor Radojević
 Adrian Radulescu
 Inal Aflitulin
 Gregor Lorger
 Darko Stevanović
 Radoslav Antl
 Šimon Macháč
 Gabriel Papp
 Andrej Petro
 Richard Štochl
 Viacheslav Sadovyi

Former coaches

References

External links
 Official website

Hungarian handball clubs
Eger